SQLyog is a GUI tool for the RDBMS MySQL. It is developed by Webyog, Inc., based in Bangalore, India, and Santa Clara, California. SQLyog is being used by more than 30,000 customers worldwide and has been downloaded more than 2,000,000 times.

History

SQLyog v0.9 was first released to the public in 2001 after eight months of development. SQLyog was available free of charge, but with closed source code, until v3.0 when it was made a fully commercial software. Nowadays SQLyog is distributed both as free software as well as several paid, proprietary, versions. The free software version is known as Community Edition  at GitHub. Paid versions are sold as Professional, Enterprise and Ultimate Editions.

Features

Prominent features of SQLyog are:

 64-bit binaries are available from version 11.0.
 Editor with syntax highlighting and various automatic formatting options
 Intelligent Code Completion
 Data manipulations (INSERT, UPDATE, DELETE) may be done from a spreadsheet-like interface.  Both raw table data and a result set from a query can be manipulated.
 Visual Schema Designer
 Visual Query Builder
 Query Formatter
 Connectivity options: Direct client/server using MySQL API (SSL supported), HTTP/HTTPS tunneling, SSH tunneling
 Wizard-driven tool for import of data from ODBC-databases
 Backup Tool for performing unattended backups. Backups may be compressed and optionally stored as a file-per-table as well as identified with a timestamp.
 "SQL Scheduler and Reporting Tool" - a tool for scheduling and automating execution of any sequence of SQL statements. Result of queries may be sent as HTML-formatted reports.
 Schema/Structure Synchronization and Data Synchronization
 Query Profiler and Redundant Index Finder
 All automated jobs have mail alerting and reporting options.
 Full character set/Unicode support
 A "Data Search" feature using a Google-type search syntax translated transparently for user to SQL.
 Form view to display one row at a time
 Foreign key lookup
 Visual Data Compare

Technical Specification

 Programmed and developed in C++ using Win32 API. No dependencies on runtimes (.NET, Java etc.).
 Uses MySQL C API to communicate with MySQL servers. No dependencies on database abstraction layers (like ODBC/JDBC).
 Uses SQLite to store internal data like Grid settings. Consequently, these settings are persistent across sessions on a per-table basis.

Platforms

SQLyog works on the Windows platform ranging from Windows Vista to Windows 10. (Windows 9x/ME support was removed in version 5.0, Windows 2000 support stopped with version 8.6, and Windows XP support ended with version 12.5.) It has also been made to work under Linux and various Unixes (including macOS) using the Wine environment.  Further, a subset of SQLyog Enterprise/Ultimate functionalities are available with the free SJA (SQLyog Job Agent) for Linux as a native Linux utility. This makes it possible to specify and test "scheduled jobs" on a Windows environment and port execution parameters seamlessly to a Linux environment.

Support 

Webyog provides priority support to customers primarily through a ticket based support system. Users of Community Edition can get support through Webyog Forums which has more than 15000 registered users. Webyog also maintains an extensive FAQ for most commonly asked questions.

See also
 Comparison of database tools

References

External links 
 Official Webyog home page
 Community Edition project page
 Comparison Sheet between Community and commercial editions
 SQLyog Screenshots
 Interview with Rohit Nadhani, MySQL AB, August 23rd, 2006

Database administration tools